2014–15 Belarusian Cup was the twenty fourth season of the Belarusian annual cup competition. Contrary to the league season, it is conducted in a fall-spring rhythm. The first games were played on 22 May 2014. Winners of the Cup were to qualify for the second qualifying round of the 2015–16 UEFA Europa League, but since BATE also won the 2014 league season, they went into Champions League instead.

Participating clubs 
The following teams will take part in the competition:

Preliminary round
In the only match of the preliminary round played two teams from the Second League, which were drawn at random.

First round
In this round the winners of Preliminary Round were joined by another 19 clubs from the Second League and 4 amateur clubs. Zhlobin, as the team with the best record at the moment of the draw, were given a bye to the Second Round. 

The draw was conducted on 8 May 2014. The matches were played between 25 and 27 May 2014.

Second round
In this round 12 winners of the First Round were drawn against Zhlobin (given a bye to this round) and 11 clubs from the First League. Rechitsa-2014, Isloch Minsk Raion, Vitebsk and Slavia Mozyr were given a bye to the Round of 32 as teams with the best record at the moment of the draw.

The draw was conducted on 28 May 2014. The matches were played on 10 and 11 June 2014.

Round of 32
In this round 12 winners of the Second Round were drawn against four First League clubs that were given bye to this round and 8 clubs from Premier League.

The four Premier League clubs that qualified for 2014–15 European Cups (BATE Borisov, Neman Grodno, Shakhtyor Soligorsk and Dinamo Minsk) were given a bye to the next round.

The draw was conducted on 17 June 2014. The matches were played between 25 and 27 July 2014.

Round of 16
The draw was conducted on 28 July 2014. The matches were played between 23 August and 13 October 2014.

Quarterfinals
The draw was conducted on 16 October 2014. The first leg were played on 21 and 22 March and the second leg were played on 4 April 2015.

|}

First leg

Second leg

Semifinals
The draw was conducted on 6 April 2015. The first legs were played on 15 April and the second legs were played on 29 April 2015.

|}

First leg

Second leg

Final
The final match was played on 24 May 2015 at the Central Stadium in Gomel.

External links
 Football.by

2014–15 European domestic association football cups
Cup
Cup
2014-15